THP-1 may refer to:

 THP-1 cell line
 THP-1, the first synthetic estrogen